Everton Ferreira Guimarães (born 20 May 1991), commonly known as Kaká, is a Brazilian footballer who plays as an attacking midfielder for I-League club Gokulam Kerala.

Club career
Everton Kaká spent the beginning of his career in Brazil, trained at São Paulo FC and was revealed by Botafogo do Rio de Janeiro, after professionalizing he transferred to Portugal and signed with SCU Torreense in 2011. In 2015, Kaká signed for CD. Mafra, was National champion and climbed up the division, was loaned to Académica de Coimbra and after excellent performances he was sold to Nacional da Madeira and signed a 3-year contract and was twice national champion of the Portuguese second league, returned in 2021 to do a season at CD. Mafra and moved to Saudi Arabia.

Career statistics

Club

References 

1991 births
Living people
Brazilian footballers
Brazilian expatriate footballers
Primeira Liga players
Liga Portugal 2 players
C.D. Mafra players
Associação Académica de Coimbra – O.A.F. players
C.D. Nacional players
Arar FC players
Saudi Second Division players
Association football midfielders
Expatriate footballers in Portugal
Expatriate footballers in Saudi Arabia
Brazilian expatriate sportspeople in Portugal
Brazilian expatriate sportspeople in Saudi Arabia
Footballers from São Paulo
Gokulam Kerala FC players